"Something About You" is a single released by British band Level 42 in 1985, in advance of its inclusion on the album World Machine the same year. The song was written by Mark King, Mike Lindup, Phil Gould, Boon Gould, and Wally Badarou.

Song
"Something About You" was released in several countries beyond the United Kingdom, including United States, Germany, Italy, Canada, and many countries of South America and Asia. It is the only Level 42 song to be a top 10 hit in the United States, where it reached #7 on the Billboard Hot 100 chart, and it is their second top 10 hit in the United Kingdom, reaching #6 on the UK Singles Chart. The single was certified gold in Canada in 1986.

"Something About You" appears in many Level 42 collections: Level Best, The Very Best of Level 42, and The Definitive Collection.

"Something About You" also appears on the PC version of Grand Theft Auto IV, on the Vice City FM radio station.

Music video
The music video of "Something About You", which uses the shorter single version, is directed by Stuart Orme, who also directed videos for the Level 42 songs "Lessons in Love" and "Running in the Family" (appearing in their video album Family of Five released in 1987), as well as Phil Collins and Genesis.

Mark King appears as a dark clown magician, representing the negative aspects in the relationships of Mike Lindup, Phil and Boon Gould with their girlfriends, all played by actress Cherie Lunghi.

Chart performance

Weekly charts

Year-end charts

See also
 1985 in music
 Level 42 discography

References

Level 42 songs
1985 singles
Songs written by Mark King (musician)
Songs written by Mike Lindup
1985 songs
Songs written by Wally Badarou
Songs written by Phil Gould (musician)
Songs written by Boon Gould
Polydor Records singles